The First National Bank was located in the Kabutocho area, the business centre of Tokyo. Kabuto-cho was crowded with the core institutions of Japan's modern economy, including banks, the commodity exchange, and the stock exchange.

History 
The First National Bank building was initially constructed in 1872 as the main bank of the Mitsui group. In the following year, it became the headquarters of the First National Bank (Dai-Ichi Kangyo Bank), which was founded by Shibusawa Eiichi (1840-1931) and other businessmen. The building featured a traditional Edo-style structure, but its exterior was in a pseudo-western style. Shimizu Kisuke II, who designed and constructed the building, had practiced western-style architecture in the foreign concession in Yokohama and was Japan's leading house builder. He also worked on structures such as the "Tsukiji Hotel" and the "Mitsui House" at Suruga-cho.

During the Meiji period, western architectural style and designs by foreign architects were adopted for many government facilities. Pseudo western-style buildings, mixing western and Japanese styles, were often constructed for the private sector.

Buildings of the Meiji period
Buildings and structures in Chūō, Tokyo
Commercial buildings completed in 1872
1872 establishments in Japan